Jose Cuervo is the best-selling  brand of tequila, selling a fifth of the tequila consumed worldwide.

As of 2012, Jose Cuervo sells 3.5 million cases of tequila in the US annually, accounting for  a third of the US tequila market. 
Jose Cuervo is family-owned and is run today by the Beckmann family of Mexico, descendants of Don José Antonio de Cuervo. Juan-Domingo Beckmann is the sixth-generation leader of the company. In July 2013 Proximo Spirits took over US distribution of Jose Cuervo from Diageo, following Diageo's failed attempt to buy the company.

History

Early history
In 1758, Don José Antonio de Cuervo was issued a land grant by King Ferdinand VI of Spain in the town of Tequila, Jalisco. Here his family founded the Taberna de Cuervo, the farm where they would cultivate and harvest the flowering blue agave plant, a water-retaining plant found in central Mexico that is distilled to create tequila. The first Vino Mezcal de Tequila de Jose Cuervo was made in 1795, after Don José Antonio de Cuervo's son José María Guadalupe de Cuervo was granted a permit from King Carlos IV of Spain to produce tequila commercially, following a time of prohibition under King Carlos III. This was the birth of the tequila industry.

By 1880, the Cuervo family had begun individually bottling tequila for commercial distribution. Cuervo was the first distiller to bottle tequila, at a time when other distillers were still using barrels. Tequila was known as "mezcal de tequila" until 1893, when tequila makers and the Mexican government dropped "mezcal" from the name. Cuervo's first bottled tequila was sold in 1906.

Upon the death of Don Jesús, his wife, Ana González Rubio, inherited La Rojeña and in 1900 married José Cuervo Labastida, head of La Constancia. From then on, the brand became Jose Cuervo Tequila. After Ana Gonzélez Rubio's death in 1934, the estate was left to her niece Guadalupe Gallardo, who died in 1966 and left the estate to her sister, Virginia Gallardo. One of her sons, Juan Beckmann Gallardo, would manage the business. Part of Cuervo was owned by Distribuidora Bega, and, starting in 1979, the other part was owned by Grupo Cuervo, made up of Beckmann, his son Juan Beckmann Vidal, José Luis Campos, and Heublein Inc.

Recent history
Along with Sauza, Cuervo began to dominate the tequila industry in the 1940s. Tequila first made significant inroads into the United States during the Prohibition era, when it was smuggled from Mexico into southwestern US states. Tequila made further advances in the US during World War II, when many US distilleries switched to war-related production and there were restrictions on European imports. Then, in the 1980s, more American tourists visited Mexico, discovering tequila. According to the Distilled Spirits Council of the United States, the US demand for tequila has risen over the years, with 12 million cases shipped to the US in 2012, a 54% increase as compared to a decade earlier. The fastest-growing segment has been super-premium blue agave spirits.

In 1989, the Beckmann family sold 45% of Jose Cuervo to International Distillers and Vintners (IDV), a division of Grand Metropolitan PLC. In 1997, Grand Metropolitan merged with Guinness plc to become Diageo which would be Jose Cuervo's main distributor outside of Mexico until 2013. Starting in 2011, Diageo, the world's largest liquor maker, was in talks to acquire Jose Cuervo from the Beckmann family for in excess of $3 billion. After it was unable to acquire the brand, Diageo announced in December 2012 that it would end the US distribution deal. In a deal first announced in March 2013, Proximo Spirits, a company owned by the Beckmann family, took over Jose Cuervo's distribution beginning in July 2013.

La Rojeña distillery

Background
Jose Cuervo is produced at the La Rojeña distillery in the state of Jalisco in Mexico. The distillery was officially founded in 1812. It is the oldest active distillery in Latin America. After Ana González Rubio married José Cuervo Labastida in 1900, he renamed the distillery La Rojeña, and was the first to call the tequila produced there Jose Cuervo. After the death of Don Vincente, Jesús Flores (owner of the distillery now known as La Constancia) took over management of La Rojeña. He was the first to package the tequila into damajuanas (rope-encased jugs), where previously they had been stored only in wooden barrels. The damajuanas were later replaced with individual bottles, making it easier to transport the tequila across the border to America. The company shipped its first export of three bottles across the border in 1873.

In order for a spirit to be called tequila, it must come from the blue agave plant, a species found only in Jalisco and four nearby regions in central Mexico. All Jose Cuervo tequila continues to be made in the town of Tequila in the state of Jalisco in Mexico.

Distillation process
The blue agave plant has spiked leaves and a round, fleshy core (the piña). The leaves are chopped off and the core is cooked and crushed to create juice, which is fermented and distilled to make tequila. The resulting unaged, clear tequila is then diluted with water to bring the alcohol content down to around 40%. Pure tequila is distilled 100% from the sap of the blue agave plant, while mixto tequilas only need to be at least 51% blue agave in order to legally be called tequila. In 1964, tequila makers were allowed to obtain up to 30% of the sugars in tequila from sources other than the agave plant. During a blue agave shortage in the 1970s, Mexican regulations were further revised to require that tequila contain only 51.5% agave. Agave plants take 10 to 12 years to mature and become ripe, while sugarcane can be harvested every year, so blending the agave spirit with sugarcane spirit is a cheaper method, while using 100% blue agave plant is more expensive.

The Cuervo Express
The Jose Cuervo Express train was opened to visitors in February 2012 to help promote tourist development in the Jalisco area. The train travels 60 kilometers from Guadalajara to Tequila, taking two hours to journey through the agave fields and past volcanoes. Upon arrival in Tequila, guests are able to take a tour of the Jose Cuervo factory and La Rojeña distillery.

Types of tequila

Silver
Tequila is naturally clear after fermentation and distillation are complete. This type is called “blanco” or “white”.  “Plata” or “silver” on the other hand, despite its color being the same as “blanco”, is an aged version of tequila which got decolorized after being kept in barrels for months or years.

Gold
After the fermentation and distillation processes, tequila can then be aged in oak barrels, giving it a golden hue. There are three variations of gold tequila. Reposados have a pale amber color, as they typically spend 2 to 12 months in oak barrels. Añejos have a darker gold color and more flavor contributions from the barrel, as they are typically aged 1 to 3 years in oak barrels. Extra añejo, which has an even darker color and richer flavor, is 100% blue agave and aged more than three years. The occasionally smoky flavors of extra añejo tequilas have been compared to those typically found in brandy and scotch. The extra añejo designation for tequilas aged more than three years was approved by Mexico's National Committee on Standardization in 2006.

Jose Cuervo tequilas

Especial Silver
Cuervo Especial products are mixto tequilas. Especial Silver is an unaged white tequila containing at least 51% agave, with the remainder being made up of sugarcane spirit.

Especial Reposado
Especial Reposado (commonly referred to as "Cuervo Gold") is peng. reposado and younger tequilas of at least 51% agave, with caramel coloring added to the finished product to give it the gold color, also known as joven tequila.

Cinge
In 2013, Proximo launched Jose Cuervo Cinge, a cinnamon-infused 35% abv version of Especial Silver.  It is one of many cinnamon-infused liquors on the market.  See Fireball and discussion therein.

Tradicional
Cuervo's Tradicional has been produced since 1795. Its varieties, Silver and Reposado, are 100% agave tequilas. The reposado achieves its amber color through six months of barrel aging. Silver was launched in 2011.

Black
Cuervo Black was a mixto añejo tequila that included sugar cane spirit, aged one year in oak barrels. It was named on Bloomberg Businessweeks 2009 list of the world's 20 best-tasting tequilas. It is no longer available.

Platino
Platino is 100% agave, handcrafted using a proprietary process in which the steam is recaptured to bring in more flavor before the tequila is chill-filtered. It was named on Bloomberg Businessweek'''s 2009 list of the world's 20 best-tasting tequilas, and awarded the Beverage Tasting Institute's highest rating, Superlative.

Reserva de la Familia
Reserva de la Familia was introduced in 1995 to celebrate the 200th Anniversary of the distillery.  Reserva de la Familia is a high-end offering of 100% blue agave tequila, matured in the La Rojeña distillery's private cellars. Its first edition sold out weeks after its release. Reserva de la Familia is classified as an extra añejo tequila, meaning it is 100% agave aged over three years in an oak barrel, giving it a deeper golden color with a richer flavor more typically tasted in scotch or brandy. It would become Cuervo's first extra añejo offering after the high-end distinction was created in 2005. It was named on Bloomberg Businessweeks 2009 list of the world's 20 best-tasting tequilas, and on a list of the 18 best tequilas in the world in Men's Journal in 2013.

Margaritas
Cuervo offers several pre-made margaritas. The Authentic Margarita and Light Margarita varieties contain Cuervo Gold and are 9.95% alcohol by volume. Golden Margarita contains Grand Marnier liqueur along with Cuervo Gold, and is 12.7% abv. The Margarita Mix does not contain any alcohol.

1800

1800 Tequila, owned by Jose Cuervo and previously labeled Cuervo 1800 before being distributed by Proximo Spirits starting in 2008, is a 100% agave tequila, available in various silver, reposado and añejo varieties.

Maestro Dobel

Maestro Dobel Tequila is a family owned, single estate, ultra-premium Tequila, named after creator Juan Domingo Beckmann Legorreta (DOBEL), an 11th generation Tequila producer, and chief executive officer of the Tequila Jose Cuervo empire. Maestro Dobel Tequila is carefully controlled and managed from farm to bottle, and strikes a delicate balance between tradition and innovation.

Product list

Honors and awards
 In 1889, Mexican president Porfirio Díaz awarded Cuervo its first gold medal for the quality of tequila it produced.
 In 1907, Cuervo won the Gran Premio in Madrid, Spain.
 In 1909, Cuervo won the Grand Prix in Paris, France.
 In 2009, Bloomberg Businessweek named Jose Cuervo Silver, Platino, Reserva de la Familia and Black four of the world's twenty best-tasting tequilas.
 The Reserva de la Familia añejo was awarded a double gold medal at the 2012 San Francisco World Spirits Competition.

Volleyball
In 1979, Jose Cuervo became beach volleyball's first major sponsor. After the Association of Volleyball Professionals (AVP) tour folded in 2010, the Jose Cuervo Pro Beach Volleyball Series was launched in 2011 by IMG and USA Volleyball with three events across the US, and upped the number to seven in 2012.Baxter Holmes, “Beach volleyball: Jose Cuervo Series doubles events for 2012 tour,” Los Angeles Times, April 19, 2012. With the return of the AVP tour in 2013, the Cuervo Series was not continued.

In popular culture
Cuervo Gold is referred to in Steely Dan's song "Hey Nineteen", on their album Gaucho, released in 1980. The lyric is, "The Cuervo Gold / The fine Colombian / Make tonight a wonderful thing."

In 1978, after a stint as a poster girl for Jose Cuervo Tequila, Cindy Jordan wrote a country song titled "Jose Cuervo", the first song she ever wrote. The song references the tequila in the lyrics, "Jose Cuervo, you are a friend of mine." Recorded by Shelly West in 1983, it was named Billboard magazine's 1983 Country Song of the Year after reaching number 1 on the Billboard country songs chart.

The song "Ten Rounds with Jose Cuervo" by country music artist Tracy Byrd documents a man's night drinking Cuervo after his girlfriend breaks up with him. It reached number 1 on the Billboard country songs chart in 2002. Other country songs that mention the liquor are "The Dope Smokin' Song" by Hank Flamingo and "Drink Canada Dry" by David Allan Coe.

In the 2004 MMORPG game World of Warcraft, there are some items referencing Jose Cuervo, like "Cuergo's Gold" and "Hozen Cuervo".

In Carrie Underwood's 2008 song Last Name describing a woman meeting a man at a club and later eloping with him in Las Vegas after having had too much to drink that night,  Cuervo tequila is referenced in the line "So I'll blame it on the Cuervo".

Cuervo Silver is shown to be enjoyed on multiple occasions on the Showtime series Dexter (2006–13).

A moody 2013 ad campaign for Cuervo Especial starred actor Kiefer Sutherland.

Beyoncé references Jose Cuervo on her 2016 song "Formation", from her album Lemonade'', with the line, "I twirl on my haters, albino alligators / El Camino with the seat low, sippin’ Cuervo with no chaser."

References

Footnotes

Endnotes

External link 

 

Tequila
Drink companies of Mexico
Food and drink companies established in 1795
Mexican brands
Alcoholic drink brands
1795 establishments in New Spain